The Usk Reservoir is located in the upper Usk Valley, at  above sea level, in the western part of the Brecon Beacons National Park, Wales. The county boundary between Carmarthenshire and Powys runs through the reservoir which lies about six miles to the north of the Black Mountain escarpment. It is an important landmark for walkers on the mountain range.

History

Completed in 1955 by Swansea City Council, the dam is approximately 109 ft (33m) in height and 1600 ft (480m) in width. It was the first example in the UK of an earth dam with horizontal drainage blankets. The reservoir is now owned by Welsh Water and the surrounding forests are managed on their behalf by Natural Resources Wales. Most of the area is open to walkers and cyclists via forest tracks and other footpaths. There are several small car parks for visitors. The reservoir is stocked with freshwater fish such as trout and can be fished with an appropriate licence.

References

External links

Usk reservoir in the Brecon Beacons national park
www.geograph.co.uk : photos of the Usk reservoir and surrounding area

Dams in Wales
Reservoirs in Powys
Dams in Powys
Reservoirs in Carmarthenshire
Reservoirs in the Brecon Beacons National Park
Reservoir, Usk